Praça do Cabo de Rama is a medieval hillfort on the coast of Canacona, Goa.

History
In the 1760s, the Portuguese gained control of Cabo de Rama after the Raja of Soonda surrendered his territory to them in return for protection against Hyder Ali of Mysore. Prior to that, the fort had regularly switched hands between Hindu and Muslim monarchs. The present structure with its walls, moats, ramparts turrets, chapel and cannons are remnants of the Portuguese era. The Portuguese equipped it with 21 guns and installed military barracks, a commander's quarter and a chapel. 

In 1799, the Fourth Anglo-Mysore War saw the defeat of the King of Mysore, thus bringing an end to the Portuguese's primary rival in the region. Over time, the purpose of the fort shifted from being a defensive structure, to a prison. This fort housed a government prison till 1955.

Today, this fort is in partial ruins, but is a popular tourist attraction of Goa.

Inside Cabo de Rama is the Capela de Santo António, a chapel which is still in use.

Cliffs drop steeply to the sea at the western side of the fort, which overlooks the entire length of Colva beach and the Canacona stretch.

Gallery

External links
 http://www.goavacationguide.com/cabo-fort.html
 https://web.archive.org/web/20111028184819/http://www.about-goa-blog.net/2011/01/cabo-de-rama-fort-canacona-south-goa.html
 Cabo de Rama stunning pictures and spherical panoramas 360°
 Cabo de Rama Fort and beach 

Forts in Goa
Portuguese forts